The Men's junior time trial of the 2016 UCI Road World Championships took place in and around in Doha, Qatar on 11 October 2016.

After winning the bronze medal in 2015, Brandon McNulty won the gold medal for the United States, finishing 35.18 seconds clear of his next closest competitor, Mikkel Bjerg from Denmark. The bronze medal was won by McNulty's compatriot Ian Garrison, 17.90 seconds behind Bjerg and 53.08 seconds in arrears of McNulty.

Qualification

Qualification for the event

All National Federations were allowed to enter four riders for the race, with a maximum of two riders to start. In addition to this number, the outgoing World Champion and the current continental champions were also able to take part.

Schedule
All times are in Arabia Standard Time (UTC+3).

Final classification

References

Men's junior time trial
UCI Road World Championships – Men's junior time trial